Vickery is an unincorporated community and census-designated places in western Townsend Township, Sandusky County, Ohio, United States.  It has a post office with the ZIP code 43464 and a volunteer fire department called Townsend Township FD.

History
Vickery was platted in 1881 by Robert Vickery, and named for him. A post office has been in operation at Vickery since 1881.

References

Unincorporated communities in Sandusky County, Ohio
Unincorporated communities in Ohio
Census-designated places in Sandusky County, Ohio